Grøtsundet is a strait between Tromsø and Karlsøy in Troms og Finnmark county, Norway.

References

Straits of Norway
Landforms of Troms og Finnmark
Tromsø